Cognet may refer to:

 Cognet, Isère, a town in France
 CogNet, an online resource for cognitive sciences developed by MIT Press
 Cognet Inc., a telecommunications company acquired by Intel
 Christophe Cognet, French film director and documentary filmmaker

See also
 
 Cognat, a surname
 Coignet, a surname
 Cognetti (disambiguation)
 Cognetics (disambiguation)